Barhiaga is a town in the Manni Department of Gnagna Province in eastern Burkina Faso. The town has a population of 1,410.

References

Populated places in the Est Region (Burkina Faso)
Gnagna Province